Tina Winklmann (born 26 February 1980) is a German politician of Alliance 90/The Greens who has been serving as a member of the Bundestag since the 2021 elections.

Early career
From 2001 to 2019, Winklmann worked at a Siemens site in Amberg.

Political career
Winklmann became a member of the Alliance 90/The Greens party in 1996.

In parliament, Winklmann has been serving on the Committee on Labour and Social Affairs and the Sports Committee. In addition to her committee assignments, she is part of the Parliamentary Friendship Group for Relations with Slovakia, the Czech Republic and Hungary.

Other activities
 IG Metall, Member.

References

External links 
 

Living people
1980 births
Politicians from Bavaria
21st-century German politicians
21st-century German women politicians
Members of the Bundestag for Alliance 90/The Greens
Members of the Bundestag 2021–2025
Female members of the Bundestag